Zvezdan Savo Ljubobratović (born 27 May 1971) is a retired Croatian footballer.

Club career
He played two games and scored a goal in the 1997–98 UEFA Cup for Maribor against Ajax.

External links
 

1971 births
Living people
Sportspeople from Bjelovar
Association football forwards
Yugoslav footballers
Croatian footballers
NK Bjelovar players
Hércules CF players
NK Pazinka players
NK Maribor players
Sint-Truidense V.V. players
HNK Šibenik players
FC Rubin Kazan players
Croatian Football League players
Slovenian PrvaLiga players
Belgian Pro League players
Russian Premier League players
Croatian expatriate footballers
Expatriate footballers in Spain
Expatriate footballers in Slovenia
Expatriate footballers in Belgium
Expatriate footballers in Russia
Croatian expatriate sportspeople in Slovenia
Croatian expatriate sportspeople in Spain
Croatian expatriate sportspeople in Belgium
Croatian expatriate sportspeople in Russia